Jeroen Spaans (born 17 August 1973) is a Dutch rower. He competed in the men's lightweight coxless four event at the 2000 Summer Olympics.

References

1973 births
Living people
Dutch male rowers
Olympic rowers of the Netherlands
Rowers at the 2000 Summer Olympics
Sportspeople from Enschede